The FIBA Asia Under-18 Championship 2010 is the 2010 edition of the FIBA Asia's youth championship for basketball. The games were held at Sana'a, Yemen between 22 September and 1 October 2010.
The top 3 teams qualified for the FIBA Under-19 World Championship 2011 in Latvia.

Qualification

According to the FIBA Asia rules, each zone had two places, and the hosts (Yemen) and holders (Iran) were automatically qualified. The other four places are allocated to the zones according to performance in the 2008 FIBA Asia Under-18 Championship.

Draw

Preliminary round

Group A

Group B

Group C

Group D

Second round
 The results and the points of the matches between the same teams that were already played during the preliminary round shall be taken into account for the second round.

Group E

Group F

Classification 13th–16th

Semifinals

15th place

13th place

Classification 9th–12th

Semifinals

11th place

9th place

Final round

Quarterfinals

Semifinals 5th–8th

Semifinals

7th place

5th place

3rd place

Final

Final standing

Awards

External links
Official website
Fiba Asia

 
FIBA Asia Under-18 Championship
2010–11 in Asian basketball
2010 in Yemen
International sports competitions hosted by Yemen
September 2010 sports events in Asia
October 2010 sports events in Asia